Jos Vanstiphout (1951–2013) was a Belgian sports psychologist who was specialized in golf. Despite having no professional training as a psychologist, he has worked with notable clients, including Ernie Els, Thomas Levet, Retief Goosen, Michael Campbell, Pádraig Harrington, Barry Lane, Sergio García and Søren Hansen. He was a member of IMG.

Early life
Vanstiphout was born in Houthalen and grew up in Antwerp. He left school when he was 14 years old and took on a number of odd jobs. He formed the band The Mayfair Set which was the Belgian selection for the World Popular Song Festival, but their only album failed to gain further popularity.

Career
Vanstiphout started working as a newspaper ad salesman, and got interested in psychology. His main interests were Edward de Bono and sports guru Timothy Gallwey, author of The Inner Game of... series. After he met Gallwey, he developed his own similar ideas. He then followed the PGA European Tour for three years before signing a contract with his first client, either Ross Drummond or Rolf Muntz. He started working with Retief Goosen in 1999 when he was ranked number 83 in the world, and helped bring him to world ranking number 4 and a win at the 2001 U.S. Open Golf Championship. This brought him to the attention of many other top golfers. Goosen publicly acknowledged the work of Vanstiphout in helping him win the 2001 Championship.

Over the next few years, Vanstiphout became the sport psychologist for a number of the top professional golf players, including Ernie Els and Retief Goosen. As of 2009, he worked with a.o. Ernie Els, Paul McGinley, Darren Clarke, Michael Campbell and David Howell. He also has worked with a few other sportspeople, including cricketer Andrew Flintoff. Jos died in December 2013.

Clients

Aaron Baddeley
Rich Beem
Thomas Bjørn
Ángel Cabrera
Michael Campbell
Darren Clarke
Ross Drummond
Ernie Els
Gary Evans
Andrew Flintoff
Sergio García
Retief Goosen
Søren Hansen
Pádraig Harrington
Grégory Havret
David Howell
Raphaël Jacquelin
Maarten Lafeber
Barry Lane
Thomas Levet
Carl Mason
Paul McGinley
Mark McNulty
Rolf Muntz
Gary Murphy
Eduardo Romero
Justin Rose
Adam Scott
Marcel Siem
Vijay Singh

References

1951 births
Living people
Belgian psychologists
People from Houthalen-Helchteren